The 2004 Brazilian Grand Prix (officially the Formula 1 Grande Prêmio do Brasil 2004) was a Formula One motor race held on 24 October 2004 at the Autódromo José Carlos Pace. It was Race 18 of 18 in the 2004 FIA Formula One World Championship. It marked the first time that a GP in Brazil was held at the end of the F1 season , and local fans were delighted when Brazil's Rubens Barrichello took pole for his home race. It would be Barrichello's first non-retirement at Interlagos in ten years, his previous finish at the circuit being at the season opener in 1994. The early laps were held in changeable conditions, and the race ended up as a duel between Kimi Räikkönen and Juan Pablo Montoya, who were to be McLaren teammates for 2005. The Colombian took victory in his final race for Williams, which was also the last win for the Williams team until the 2012 Spanish Grand Prix. Montoya's move to take the lead was brave even by his standards. Elsewhere, Jaguar's final race was a failure of epic proportions, with their two drivers colliding, with Webber trying an optimistic-looking move on Klien whilst expecting his teammate to move over.

Ricardo Zonta returned to his home race for the Toyota team, replacing Olivier Panis, who had retired from the sport after the previous race.

Friday drivers
The bottom 6 teams in the 2003 Constructors' Championship were entitled to run a third car in free practice on Friday. These drivers drove on Friday but did not compete in qualifying or the race.

Classification

Qualifying 

Michael Schumacher qualified eighth but was demoted ten places because of an engine change. The engine was damaged in a crash during practice.

Race

 Baumgartner and Bruni started the race from the pitlane.

Championship standings after the race 
Bold text indicates the World Champions.

Drivers' Championship standings

Constructors' Championship standings

Note: Only the top five positions are included for both sets of standings.

Footnotes

References

Brazilian Grand Prix
Brazilian Grand Prix
Grand Prix
Brazilian Grand Prix